The Roy J. and Lucille A. Carver College of Medicine (also known as CCOM or Carver) is the medical school of the University of Iowa, located in Iowa City, Iowa, United States. The first medical college associated with the University of Iowa was founded in 1850, in the small town of Keokuk, Iowa, but the current Iowa City program can trace its roots to 1870. The program became notable as the first co-educational medical school in the United States, and was one of 22 original members of the Association of American Medical Colleges in 1876.

History 
The Iowa State Legislature approved plans for medical training on the main campus of the University of Iowa in 1868, and ten women were among the first class in 1870  The first purpose-built university hospital did not open its doors until 1898.

The UI hospitals' clinical capacity was increased tenfold, from 50 to 500 beds. In 1922, the Rockefeller Foundation gave the University $2.25 million, with state matching funds, to build a new University Hospital on the west campus, where the modern hospital buildings remain today.  Statewide ambulance service began in 1932.

In 1939, Iowa researchers developed modern blood banking and UI hospitals became the first in the world to develop a successful method of freezing human sperm, leading to a live birth in 1952.  Other innovations from this period include the first human EEG recordings, first description of how blood is supplied to the prostate gland, the Ponseti Method of surgical treatment of clubfoot, and one of the world's first heart-lung machines.

In 1998, the UI hospitals were certified as a Level I Trauma Center with pediatric commitment by the American College of Surgeons.  In 2002, in recognition of $90 million in total contributions, the UI College of Medicine was renamed after Roy J. Carver and his widow, Lucille A. Carver.

Profile

The student body of each entering class of the medical school consists of about 150 students. About two-thirds are in-state students. 11 are in the MSTP program. Nearly half of the students are female. The student body has close to 600 medical students, 650 resident and fellow physicians, 200 associated medical science students, and 50 physician assistant students. Also, 5,000 undergraduate students are enrolled in science classes at the school.

The school has between 900 and 1,000 faculty members and more than 3,000 staff members.

Admissions
Carver College of Medicine participates in AMCAS, and will then send applicants who meet a minimum set of requirements a secondary application.

After an applicant's file is complete, then the school may invite the applicant to visit for an interview. Interviews are for one day each held starting in mid-September and run through January.

Interviewees are offered the option of staying with a student host before or after their visit. Hosting students are either from SNMA or MSAP (medical student ambassadors program).

Academics 

CCOM underwent a major change in their curriculum that went into effect in August 2014 for the Class of 2018. This involved shortening the preclinical curriculum to 18 months, and moving Step 1 to after completion of the core clinical rotations.

Preclinical
After an introductory semester in a Foundations Block, the curriculum is then composed of three distinct courses: mechanisms of health and disease (MOHD), medicine and society (MAS), and clinical and professional skills (CAPS).

Grading for MAS and CAPS is pass/fail, but for Foundations/MOHD it is honors/near honors/pass/fail (not normalized).

Clinical

Core rotations
The 48 weeks of required core rotations are composed of four separate blocks of twelve weeks each: ambulatory, inpatient, neurology/psychiatry, and selectives.

The Ambulatory Practice Module (APM) includes outpatient internal medicine, family medicine, and community based primary care.

The inpatient block includes inpatient internal medicine, ObGyn, pediatrics, and surgery.

For psychiatry and neurology, students complete four weeks in each service and have four additional weeks to get ahead on selectives.

Finally, for selectives, students choose to complete six rotations of two weeks each in anesthesia, dermatology, lab med EKG, ophthalmology, orthopedics, otolaryngology, radiology, and urology.

Teaching affiliates
 University of Iowa Hospitals and Clinics (UIHC)
 Iowa City VA Hospital
 Des Moines Medical Education Consortium (Broadlawns Medical Center, Blank Children's Hospital, Iowa Lutheran, Iowa Methodist)
 Clinics throughout Iowa (mostly private)

Distinction tracks
CCOM offers multiple tracks to allow give MD students a structured way to explore additional interests above and beyond the traditional medical school curriculum:

 Teaching  Recognizes completion of coursework, time spent working with a mentor, and teaching experiences.
 Global Health  Involves an elective rotation abroad and learning about service, policy making, research and teaching.
 Research  Requires a substantial investment of time in a research project and either a publication or presentation.
 Humanities  Develops students' abilities in ethics, writing and humanities.
 Healthcare Delivery  Introduced in 2016, with the Tippie College of Business as the major partner, completion of a series of courses in business allow for a better understanding of how to improve healthcare delivery.
 Service  Recognizes commitment to helping the underserved.

Other programs
 CCOM Rural Iowa Scholars Program  CRISP offers to help offset the costs of attendance in return for a commitment to serve as a primary care provider in rural Iowa.
 Community Health Outreach  CHO is a two-year elective with an emphasis on service learning. The course is organized and led by second year medical students. It combines classroom learning with experiences serving through local organizations. To complete the program, students must carry out a self-directed project with an underserved or vulnerable population. Local partners include the local Ronald McDonald House and Grow Johnson County. 
 Introduction to Medical Education at Iowa  IMEI is a 6-week summer program for a cohort of ~20 pre-M1 students designed to allow students to adapt life in Iowa City and prepare for the rigors of medical school academics in the fall. The program has been running for ~20 years. The program consists is primarily composed of selected sample of classes that students will encounter in the fall (covering biochemistry, anatomy, anatomy lab, genetics). In 2016, there were also some social events included, such as a night out to watch the MLB minor league team play (Cedar Rapids Kernels), a progressive dinner, and an afternoon grill party at City Park. In 2016, there was a stipend of ~$3000 offered to offset any costs incurred in participating.

Research
UI Carver College of Medicine received $228.1 million in external research funding in FY 2010.

Centers within the Carver College of Medicine
 Center on Aging
 Center for Auditory Regeneration and Deafness
 Center for Bioinformatics and Computational Biology
 Holden Comprehensive Cancer Center, one of 39 NCI-designated comprehensive cancer centers in the nation
 Cardiovascular Research Center
 Craniofacial Research Center
 Cystic Fibrosis Research Center
 Fraternal Order of Eagles Diabetes Research Center
 Center for Functional Genomics of Hypertension
 Center for Gene Therapy of Cystic Fibrosis and Other Genetic Diseases
 General Clinical Research Center
 Huntington’s Disease Society of America Huntington’s Disease Center
 Center for the Implementation of Innovative Strategies in Practice
 George M. O’Brien Kidney Research Center
 Iowa Comprehensive Lung Imaging Center
 Carver Family Center for Macular Degeneration
 Senator Paul D. Wellstone Cooperative Research Center
 Specialized Center of Research in Osteoarthritis
 Helen C. Levitt Center for Viral Pathogenesis and Disease

Research programs
 Program Project Grant on Atherosclerosis
 Bacterial Respiratory Pathogens Research Unit
 Cancer and Aging Program
 Cerebral Vascular Biology Program Project Grant
 Program in Gene Discovery
 Research Program in Genetics of Prematurity
 Inflammation Program
 Pain Research Program
 NIH Vaccine Treatment and Evaluation Unit

See also
 Roy J. Carver Charitable Trust

References

External links

Medical schools in Iowa
University of Iowa
Educational institutions established in 1870
1870 establishments in Iowa